Plynteria is a genus of moths of the family Erebidae. The genus was erected by Herbert Druce in 1891.

Species
Plynteria centriponens Dyar, 1914 Panama
Plynteria conformens Dyar, 1914 Panama
Plynteria contenta Dyar, 1914 Panama
Plynteria coryphata Dyar, 1914 Panama
Plynteria costata Schaus, 1912 Costa Rica
Plynteria dilmis Dyar, 1914 Panama
Plynteria extirpens Dyar, 1914 Panama
Plynteria florens Schaus, 1912 Costa Rica
Plynteria irrespondens Dyar, 1914 Panama
Plynteria lineata H. Druce, 1891 Panama
Plynteria maises Dyar, 1914 Panama
Plynteria marginata H. Druce, 1891 Panama
Plynteria melanopasa Dyar, 1914 Panama
Plynteria stellata Schaus, 1912 Costa Rica
Plynteria unifacta Dyar, 1914 Panama

References

Calpinae